Palestine–Sudan relations are the political and economic relations between the State of Palestine and Sudan. The State of Palestine has an embassy in Khartoum. But Sudan does not have a representative office or embassy in the State of Palestine. The two countries form part of the Middle East region and share strong and similar cultural ties together. Sudan supports the independence of Palestine.

Relations 
Between 29 August and 1 September 1967, the Fourth Arab Summit (Arab League summit 1967) was held in the Capital of Sudan, Khartoum, which was known as the Summit of the Three No's.

Relations between with Palestine Liberation Organization and Sudan began in 1969. After the declaration of the independence of Palestine and the establishment of the State of Palestine on 15 November 1988, Sudan raised the diplomatic representation of an embassy with all immunities and privileges.

On 21 January 2017, the Joint Ministerial Higher Committee between the governments of the State of Palestine and Sudan signed 18 memoranda of understanding in the areas of commercial, security, international, health, justice, judicial, tourism, banking, documentation, culture, planning, information, counseling and endowments, and visas. Travel, care and social security.

Both Hamas and Palestinian Islamic Jihad criticized Sudan for agreeing to establish relations with Israel.

See also 

 Foreign relations of the State of Palestine
 Embassy of the State of Palestine in Sudan

References

Sudan
Bilateral relations of Sudan
State of Palestine–Sudan relations